Eduard Antranik Eranosyan (born 8 February 1961), nicknamed "Edo", is a Bulgarian football manager and a former player who played as a striker. Eranosyan played for Lokomotiv Plovdiv, Vitória de Setúbal, Leixões and Boavista.

Career

Player career
Beginning in 1978, he played for Lokomotiv Plovdiv (1977–1988, 1989, 1993–1994) as one of the club's most acclaimed attackers, featuring in 158 matches and scoring 62 goals in the A PFG, winning the Cup of the Soviet Army in 1983 and being the championship's top goalscorer in 1984. Later, he also played in Greece and Portugal, for Apollon Kalamarias (1988–1989), Vitória (1989–1990), Leixões S.C. (1990–1991, 1992–1993 and 1996–1997) and Boavista F.C. (1991–1992). Eranosyan has 10 caps for the Bulgaria national football team. He was known for his flair and view of the game.

Manager career
Eranosyan began his managing career at Leixões, which he coached between 1997 and 1999. He then took up the manager job at Lokomotiv Plovdiv, remaining there in 2000–2001 and between 2003 and 2005 (leading the team to its first and only championship title in 2004), also managing PFC Dobrudzha Dobrich in 2001–2002. Since 23 March 2007, he has been at the helm of PFC Beroe Stara Zagora. After he moved in Cyprus for APOP Kinyras Peyias. Then, in December 2008 he changed to Enosis Neon Paralimni continuing his adventure in Cyprus. In 2013 was appointed as a head coach of Angola football club Kabuscorp Sport Club.

Eranosyan also holds Portuguese citizenship.

Honours

Player honours
Lokomotiv Plovdiv
 Cup of the Soviet Army (1): 1983
 Bulgarian A PFG top goalscorer (1): 1984

Boavista F.C.
 Taça de Portugal (1): 1991–92

Manager honours
Lokomotiv Plovdiv
 Bulgarian A PFG (1): 2003-04
 Bulgarian Supercup (1): 2004
 Manager of the year in Bulgarian football (1): 2004

Kabuscorp S.C.P.
 Girabola (1): 2013

References

External links
 

1961 births
Living people
Bulgarian people of Armenian descent
Bulgarian footballers
Bulgarian expatriate footballers
Bulgaria international footballers
PFC Lokomotiv Plovdiv players
Boavista F.C. players
Apollon Pontou FC players
First Professional Football League (Bulgaria) players
Bulgarian football managers
Bulgarian expatriate football managers
PFC Beroe Stara Zagora managers
PFC Lokomotiv Plovdiv managers
Enosis Neon Paralimni FC managers
Expatriate football managers in Cyprus
Bulgarian expatriate sportspeople in Cyprus
Expatriate football managers in Angola
Kabuscorp S.C.P. managers
PFC Ludogorets Razgrad managers
OFC Vihren Sandanski managers
Doxa Katokopias FC managers
Bulgarian expatriate sportspeople in Portugal
Expatriate footballers in Portugal
Association football forwards
Armenian footballers
Footballers from Plovdiv